The Slut (translit. Ha-Notenet) is a 2011 Israeli drama film directed by Hagar Ben-Asher. It stars Hagar Ben-Asher as the titular character, Ishai Golan, Icho Avital, Yoav Levi and Tsahi Hanan. The film premiered in May 2011 at the Cannes Film Festival and featured in the International Critics' Week.

Plot 
Tamar, a promiscuous thirty-something, lives on a farm with her two daughters and occupies her spare time with a string of lovers. A new arrival in the village, a veterinary surgeon who treats one of her injured livestock, soon falls under her spell and they become romantically involved, but can she survive in a monogamous relationship?

Cast 
 Hagar Ben-Asher as Tamar
 Ishai Golan as Shai
 Icho Avital 
 Yoav Levi 
 Tsahi Hanan

Production
Many think that in the sex scene between Hagar Ben-Asher and Ishai Golan the penetration is not simulated, but the actor said it was only an illusion. "Did we have sex on camera? No. Our acting technique was really refined by the time we shot that scene, after so much rehearsal and repetition. We shot that scene on our final day, when our technique was at its absolute best. It was the culmination of a long process of working together, and I felt really safe," he said.

Release
The film premiered in May 2011 at the Cannes Film Festival and featured in the International Critics' Week. It won an award for Best Director at the 2011 Jerusalem Film Festival and was entered into the director's category at the Chicago International Film Festival later that year.

Reception
Todd McCarthy of The Hollywood Reporter described the film as "a slow-going, rather pointless Israeli drama about an attractive rural woman who just gotta have it. Notoriety of its title and content will attract some attention on the festival circuit and no doubt in Israel, but audiences will have that empty feeling afterwards."

Alissa Simon writing for Variety said that "The Slut refrains from supplying audiences with an emotional hook; lissome cipher Tamar is all id. We have no idea what she thinks or why she behaves the way she does, except, perhaps, at the pic’s not unexpected but still not well-prepared conclusion."

References

External links 
 

2011 films
Israeli drama films
2011 drama films